Wojkowice is a town in Silesian Voivodeship (south Poland).

Wojkowice may also refer to:

Wojkowice, Lower Silesian Voivodeship, a village in Wrocław County, Lower Silesian Voivodeship (south-west Poland)
Wojkowice Kościelne, a village
Vojkovice (Frýdek-Místek District), a village in the Czech Republic

See also
Vojkovice (disambiguation)